Bertil Gotthard Ohlin (23 April 1899 – 3 August 1979) was a Swedish economist and politician. He was a professor of economics at the Stockholm School of Economics from 1929 to 1965. He was also leader of the People's Party, a social-liberal party which at the time was the largest party in opposition to the governing Social Democratic Party, from 1944 to 1967. He served briefly as Minister of Commerce and Industry from 1944 to 1945 in the Swedish coalition government during World War II. He was President of the Nordic Council in 1959 and 1964.

Ohlin's name lives on in one of the standard mathematical models of international free trade, the Heckscher–Ohlin model, which he developed together with Eli Heckscher. He was jointly awarded the Nobel Memorial Prize in Economic Sciences in 1977 together with the British economist James Meade "for their pathbreaking contribution to the theory of international trade and international capital movements".

Biography 
Bertil Ohlin was raised in Klippan, Scania with seven siblings where his father Elis was a civil servant and bailiff. His mother Ingeborg influenced him with her left-liberal views on the society, with nordic partnership and Karl Staaff as her role model. Having received his B.A. from Lund University 1917 and his MSc. from Stockholm School of Economics in 1919. He obtained an M.A. from Harvard University in 1923 and his doctorate from Stockholm University in 1924. In 1925 he became a professor at the University of Copenhagen. In 1929 he debated with John Maynard Keynes, contradicting the latter's view on the consequences of the heavy war reparations payments imposed on Germany. (Keynes predicted a war caused by the burden of debt, Ohlin thought that Germany could afford the reparations.) The debate was important in the modern theory of unilateral international payments.

In 1930 Ohlin succeeded Eli Heckscher, his teacher, as a professor of economics, at the Stockholm School of Economics. In 1933 Ohlin published a work that made him world-renowned, Interregional and International Trade. In this Ohlin built an economic theory of international trade from earlier work by Heckscher and his own doctoral thesis. It is now known as the Heckscher–Ohlin model, one of the standard model economists use to debate trade theory.

The model was a break-through because it showed how comparative advantage might relate to general features of a country's capital and labor, and how these features might change through time. The model provided a basis for later work on the effects of protection on real wages, and has been fruitful in producing predictions and analysis; Ohlin himself used the model to derive the Heckscher–Ohlin theorem, that nations would specialize in industries most able to utilize their mix of national resources efficiently.  Today, the theory has been largely disproved, yet it is still a useful framework by which to understand international trade.

In 1937, Ohlin spent half a year at the University of California, Berkeley, as a visiting professor.

Later, Ohlin and other members of the "Stockholm school" extended Knut Wicksell's economic analysis to produce a theory of the macroeconomy anticipating Keynesianism.

Ohlin was party leader of the liberal Liberal People's Party from 1944 to 1967, the main opposition party to the Social Democrat Governments of the era, and from 1944 to 1945 was Minister of Commerce and Industry in the wartime government. His daughter Anne Wibble, representing the same party, served as Minister for Finance from 1991 to 1994.

In 2009, a street adjacent to the Stockholm School of Economics was named after Ohlin: "Bertil Ohlins Gata".

Heckscher–Ohlin theorem 

The Heckscher–Ohlin Theorem, which is concluded from the Heckscher–Ohlin model of international trade, states: trade between countries is in proportion to their relative amounts of capital and labor. In countries with an abundance of capital, wage rates tend to be high; therefore, labor-intensive products, e.g. textiles, simple electronics, etc., are more costly to produce internally. In contrast, capital-intensive products, e.g. automobiles, chemicals, etc., are less costly to produce internally. Countries with large amounts of capital will export capital-intensive products and import labor-intensive products with the proceeds. Countries with high amounts of labor will do the reverse.

The following conditions must be true:
 The major factors of production, namely labor and capital, are not available in the same proportion in both countries.
 The two goods produced either require more capital or more labor.
 Labor and capital do not move between the two countries.
 There are no costs associated with transporting the goods between countries.
 The citizens of the two trading countries have the same needs.

The theory does not depend on total amounts of capital or labor, but on the amounts per worker. This allows small countries to trade with large countries by specializing in production of products that use the factors which are more available than its trading partner. The key assumption is that capital and labor are not available in the same proportions in the two countries. That leads to specialization, which in turn benefits the country's economic welfare. The greater the difference between the two countries, the greater the gain from specialization.

Wassily Leontief made a study of the theory that seemed to invalidate it. He noted that the United States had a lot of capital; therefore, it should export capital-intensive products and import labor-intensive products. Instead, he found that it exported products that used more labor than the products it imported. This finding is known as the Leontief paradox.

Awards and decorations
   Commander Grand Cross of the Order of the Polar Star (4 June 1965)

See also 
 Contributions to liberal theory
 Ohlin Report (1956)

Significant publications 

 The German Reparations Problem, 1930
 The Cause and Phases of the World Economic Depression. Report presented to the Assembly of the League of Nations Geneva: Secretariat of the League of Nations; 1931.
 Interregional and International Trade, 1933
 Mechanisms and Objectives of Exchange Controls, 1937

Sources 
 Encyclopædia Britannica Online "International trade"
 NobelPrize.org "Why Trade?"
 Chapter 60 The Heckscher–Ohlin (Factor Proportions) Model

References

Further reading

External links 

  including the Prize Lecture on 8 December 1977 1933 and 1977 – Some Expansion Policy Problems in Cases of Unbalanced Domestic and International Economic Relations
 Bertil Ohlin
 Bertil Ohlin Institute
 Ohlin's life
 Academician RACEF, Spain
 Presentation: The Young Ohlin on the Theory of Interregional and International Trade
 IDEAS/RePEc
 
 

1899 births
1979 deaths
People from Klippan Municipality
Swedish economists
Members of the Riksdag from the Liberals (Sweden)
Members of the Första kammaren
Leaders of political parties in Sweden
Lund University alumni
Harvard University alumni
Stockholm University alumni
Academic staff of the University of Copenhagen
Academic staff of the Stockholm School of Economics
Trade economists
Nobel laureates in Economics
Swedish Nobel laureates
Swedish social liberals
Stockholm School of Economics alumni
Members of the Andra kammaren
Monetary economists
Financial economists
Keynesians
Macroeconomists
Fellows of the Econometric Society
Commanders Grand Cross of the Order of the Polar Star